Yle Uutiset is the Finnish news production unit of Yle. Yle Uutiset also produces news in Sami, Russian and English. News in the other national language, Swedish, is produced by the unit Svenska Yle.

On TV, news is broadcast daily on Yle TV1 at 11:00, 15:00, 17:00, 18:00, 20:30 and 21:45 EET. The main broadcast, at 20:30 on Yle TV1, is known as Yle Uutiset klo 20:30. It receives usually ratings from 700,000 to 900,000. If something remarkable has happened ratings are almost always over million.

Yle Uutiset modernized its look in February 2013 and facelifted in 2019. The new look includes new studios as well as new intros.

News anchors

Main anchors 
 Matti Rönkä
 Jussi-Pekka Rantanen
 Piia Pasanen

Other anchors 
 Tommy Fränti
 Marjukka Havumäki
 Marjo Rein
 Tuulia Thynell
 Hanna Visala

External links
 Yle Uutiset Homepage in Finnish on www.yle.fi
 Yle Nyheter Homepage in Swedish on www.yle.fi
 Yle News Homepage in English on www.yle.fi
 Yle Novosti Homepage in Russian on www.yle.fi

Finnish television news shows
1958 Finnish television series debuts
1950s Finnish television series
1960s Finnish television series
1970s Finnish television series
1980s Finnish television series
1990s Finnish television series
2000s Finnish television series
2010s Finnish television series
2020s Finnish television series
Yle original programming